Johnny Legg (born 10 September 1987 in Christchurch, New Zealand) is a rugby union player who played at scrum-half for Otago in the ITM Cup.

Playing career

Legg played age-group level in Canterbury and was selected to U-19 and U-20 national teams. In 2009, he moved south to Otago and made his first two appearances for the province in the 2009 Air New Zealand Cup.

In the 2010 ITM Cup, he served as the regular backup to Sean Romans at halfback, appearing in 12 of 13 Otago matches. He made his first start in a 13–11 victory over Tasman on 12 September.

External links
Otago profile

Living people
New Zealand rugby union players
Otago rugby union players
1987 births
Rugby union scrum-halves
Rugby union players from Christchurch